Pinatar Club de Fútbol was a Spanish football team based in San Pedro del Pinatar, in the autonomous community of Region of Murcia. Founded in 1965, it plays in Tercera División - Group 13, holding home games at Estadio José Antonio Pérez, which has a capacity of 3,200 seats.

In 2013, the club was dissolved due to its financial trouble.

Season to season

22 seasons in Tercera División

Famous players
 Martin Prest
  Alberto Edjogo
  Sena
 Diego Meijide

External links
Futbolme team profile 

1968 establishments in Murcia (region)
2013 disestablishments in Murcia (region)
Association football clubs established in 1968
Association football clubs disestablished in 2013
Football clubs in the Region of Murcia